Ovate may refer to:

Ovate (egg-shaped) leaves, tepals, or other botanical parts

Ovate, a type of prehistoric stone hand axe
Ovates, one of three ranks of membership in the Welsh Gorsedd

Vates or ovate, a term for ancient Celtic bards, prophets, and philosophers